is an action video game developed by Koei. It is a game in the Dynasty Warriors series. The game was released worldwide in 2007 in April in Japan, in July in North America, and in August in PAL regions for the Nintendo DS.

The game is set in ancient China. The player can choose a warrior out of Suzaku/Phoenix (朱雀), Seiryuu/Dragon (青龍) and Genbu/Chimera (玄武).

Gameplay 
The game features a "Warrior Cards" system with 120 cards. In battles, the cards are used to summon the warriors of the Dynasty Warriors series to assist the player in battles. Decks can be formed by the players. However the number of cards a player can equip is only as much as the number of player's defense points, ration stores and weapon stores in the map.

Cards are classified using the colors blue, red, yellow, green or pink (rare). Blue cards provide a skill for the player to use in battle, whereas red cards provide enhancements of player's attack rating, defense rating or health points (HP). Yellow cards provide both skills and stat increments. Blue and red cards can be leveled up to a maximum of three stars, while yellow cards have fixed stats.

Players can  progress to an adjacent point or into buildings housing the enemy general protecting the defense point required number of defeated officers (shown at the top-right corner) in that particular map. However, if the point contains a defense point, rations store or weapons store owned by the player, movement in and out of the point is unrestricted.

Ration stores and weapon stores are 'neutral' at the start of the battle, and can be claimed by either party. Claiming ownership of a rations store and weapon store increases the size and improves the fighting abilities of the owner's army respectively. Once claimed, an allied warrior in the deck will be summoned to protect the store, which can still be taken over by the opponent.

Also featured in this game is terrains with effects. For example, poisonous puddles reduce the HP of whoever steps on it, frozen grounds causes sliding, rocking ships disrupts normal movement etc.

The game is won when one of the two players break through all the opponent's defense points and defeat the enemy warrior in the main base, which only opens up after opponent loses all defense points.

Voice samples are used sparingly in this game, most of which are said by the player's characters. Some of the generals have voices as well, and all of them have different text for pre-fight and post-fight encounters.

Reception 

The game was met with very mixed reception upon release; GameRankings gave it a score of 55.46%, while it got 56 out of 100 on Metacritic.

References

External links 
  Official Game Site of Japan
  Official Game Site of Taiwan 
  Official English Game Site
 

2007 video games
Koei games
Dynasty Warriors
Nintendo DS games
Nintendo DS-only games
Video games developed in Japan